The land of the Turkana people. Turkanaland lies on the north- west corner of Kenya
Regions of Kenya

External links
About Turkanaland

Geography of Kenya